Kalateh-ye Rezaiyeh (also Romanized as Kalāteh-ye Rez̤āīyeh) is a village in Miyan Jovin Rural District, Helali District, Joghatai County, Razavi Khorasan Province, Iran. At the 2006 census, its population was 31, in 5 families.

References 

Populated places in Joghatai County